Polycestina is a genus of beetles in the family Buprestidae, containing the following species:

 Polycestina damarana (Kerremans, 1906)
 Polycestina kameli Neef de Sainval, 2002
 Polycestina quaturodecimmaculata (Fahraeus, 1851)

References

Buprestidae genera